Following My Intuition is the sixth studio album by English singer Craig David. The album was released on 30 September 2016 by Insanity Records and Sony Music and features the likes of Big Narstie, Blonde, Sigala, Hardwell and Kaytranada.

It debuted at number one on the UK Albums Chart, giving David his first number one album since his debut, Born to Do It, reached the top spot in 2000.

Background
The concept for the album began in 2014, when David previewed a teaser track titled "Cold" on his official SoundCloud page. Premiering it on his TS5 radio show the week before, he wanted to preview some of the new music he has been working on in anticipation of his long-awaited sixth studio album, which was to be officially titled or have a release date announced. A further teaser track titled "Seduction" was uploaded to the same SoundCloud page in September 2014.

On 5 September 2015, David featured on BBC Radio 1's Live Lounge with Sigala where they covered Wiz Khalifa and Charlie Puth's "See You Again" mixed with the Little Mix track "Black Magic". The following week, on 10 September, David appeared on Kurupt FM's 'Sixty Minute Takeover' on BBC Radio 1Xtra with MistaJam. He performed his debut single "Fill Me In" over Jack Ü's track "Where Are Ü Now" and it became a viral internet hit. Two snippets of potential new album tracks were also played on the night and this 1Xtra appearance led to David making surprise performances of the "Fill Me In" / "Where Are Ü Now" remix at Fabric with Kurupt FM and Alexandra Palace with Major Lazer and Diplo. It was later revealed that the Radio 1Xtra appearance had led to a collaboration between David and Big Narstie, who also featured on the show and the track they recorded, titled "When the Bassline Drops", was played on MistaJam's Radio 1 and Radio 1Xtra show on 7 November 2015, it was later revealed the track was to be released under SpeakerBox/JEM on 27 November 2015. David made a surprise appearance on the final of The X Factor on 13 December 2015, where he performed his breakthrough single "Re-Rewind" during a medley with Reggie 'n' Bollie and Fuse ODG. "When the Bassline Drops" debuted at number 50 in the UK and peaked at number 10 on 5 February 2016, becoming David's highest-charting single since 2007.

On 25 January 2016, it was announced that David had signed a recording contract with Insanity Records (a joint venture between Sony Music UK and Insanity Management) and independent company Speakerbox Media. With this announced, David's revealed album title Following My Intuition was announced. On 19 March 2016, at the second day of the Ultra Music Festival 2016, during the set of the Dutch DJ and record producer Hardwell, he appeared as a featured artist on their new track "No Holding Back". He also managed to appear on Kaytranada's debut studio album 99.9%, on the track "Got It Good", which he also co-wrote. These song were revealed to also appear on David's new album. On 19 August 2016, Craig announced on social networks that his sixth studio album, Following My Intuition, would finally be released on 30 September 2016. On the same day, he released his new single "Ain't Giving Up", a collaboration with Sigala. "Change My Love" was released as the album's fifth single on 21 October 2016.

Release and promotion
The album was announced on 19 August 2016, which also saw the release of promotional single "No Holding Back", which was collaborated with Dutch DJ and record producer Hardwell.

On the week of the album's release, it was confirmed that his "Fill Me In" / "Where Are Ü Now" performance was added on the album, entitled "16", and was released on 27 September 2016, as the second promotional release. It was also confirmed that, along with Jack Ü, the additional mixers and producers for song included Tre Jean-Marie, Richard Adlam, Hal Ritson and Wez Clarke.

"All We Needed" is the Children in Need 2016 single.

Chart performance
Following My Intuition debuted at number one on the UK Albums Chart on sales of 24,500, giving David his first number-one album since his debut, Born to Do It, reached the top spot in 2000.

Track listing

Notes
  signifies a co-producer.
  signifies an additional producer.
  signifies an original producer/artist.

Personnel
Credits adapted from album’s liner notes.

Richard Adlam - keyboards, programming, and backing producer (track 4)
Michele Balduzzi - drum programming (track 4)
Tom Barnes - producer (tracks 7, 14), vocal arrangement (track 14), drums (tracks 7, 14), percussion (track 14)
Dean Barratt - mixing (track 3)
Big Narstie - vocals (track 2)
Chris Bishop - vocal engineer (track 7)
James Boyle - drums, keyboards, piano, SFX, strings, and synth (track 3)
Tom Burbree Ely - Protools editing (track 13)
Wez Clarke - mixing and additional programming (tracks 1-3, 4-7, 11, 12, 14, 16)
Chris Connors - producer, engineer, keyboards, programming, and synthesizer (tracks 10, 17); mixing, string arrangements, and organ (track 10); drum programming and guitar (track 17)
Craig David - vocals (all tracks)
Guy Davie - mastering (track 9)
Adam Englefield - producer, bass, drums, keyboards, percussion, and programming (track 8)
Lauren Faith - vocals (track 9)
Chrystal Hall - backing vocals (track 10)
Hardwell - producer and mixing (track 15)
Stuart Hawkes - mastering (tracks 1-7, 10-18)
Ambrose Henri - additional production, programming, synthesizer, keyboards, and drum programming (track 17)
Hitimpulse - additional production, bass, drums, keyboards, percussion, and programming (track 8)
Lewis Hopkin - mastering (track 8)
Andrew Horowitz - piano (track 10)
Tre Jean-Marie - producer (tracks 5, 12, 16), vocal producer (tracks 3, 4), instrumentation (tracks 5, 12, 16), engineer (tracks 5, 12, 16, 18), mixing (track 18)
Kaytranada - producer and mixing (tracks 9, 18)
Pete Kelleher - producer (tracks 7, 14), vocal arrangement (track 14), keyboards (track 7), programming (track 14)
Sam Klempner - engineer (track 7), vocal engineer (track 14)
Ben Kohn - producer (tracks 7, 14), vocal arrangement (track 14), guitar (tracks 7, 14)
Colin Lester - executive producer
Longlivtheplug - additional programming (track 16)
Jacob Manson - producer, engineer, mixing, bass, drums, keyboards, percussion, and programming (track 8)
Anthony Marshall - producer, engineer, backing vocals, bass, drums, keyboards, and programming (track 13)
James Mullany - backing vocals (track 10)
MYKL - producer (track 11)
Marco Pasquariello - engineer and mixing (track 13)
Daniel Pearce - additional vocals (track 4)
Mark Ralph - producer, engineer, and mixing (track 8)
Hal Ritson - keyboards, programming, and backing producer (track 4)
Alan Sampson - producer (track 11)
Sigala - producer and engineer (track 1)
Matthew Sin - assistant engineer (track 10)
Dave Tozer - producer, engineer, mixing, keyboards, programming, and synthesizer (tracks 10, 17); string arrangements and organ (track 10); drum programming and guitar (track 17)
White N3rd - producer (tracks 2, 6), engineer (tracks 2, 3, 6)
Scott Wild - drums and keyboards (tracks 2, 6)
Andre Williams - producer, drums, keyboards, SFX, and synth (track 3)
Carla Marie Williams - vocal arrangement (track 14)

Charts

Weekly charts

Year-end charts

Certifications

Tour 
The Following My Intuition tour is an arena tour across the UK. It is David's first tour in 15 years.

Shows

Setlist*
{{Div col|content=# "Ain't Giving Up"
 "What's Your Flava?" 
 " Fill Me In" 
 "Louder Than Words"
 "Change My Love"
 "Walking Away"  
 "Don't Love You No More (I'm Sorry)"
 "Warm It Up"
 "Rise & Fall"
 "Nothing Like This"
 "Couldn't Be Mine"
 "Love Yourself" (Justin Bieber cover)  /"Freestyle Rap section"
 "7 Days" 
TS5 DJ Set Including:
 "Re-Rewind (The Crowd Say Bo Selecta)"
 "Covers Melody" including:
 "Where's Your Love"
 "No Scrubs" (TLC cover)/"Angels" (The xx cover)
 "Walking Away" (Live Remix)
 "Who's That Girl? (Eurythmics cover)
 "Jump Around" (House of Pain cover)
 "One Dance" (Drake cover)/"Rendezvous"
 "Temperature" (Sean Paul cover)
 "Nothing Like This

References 

2016 albums
Craig David albums
Albums produced by Kaytranada
UK garage albums
Albums produced by TMS (production team)
Albums produced by Tre Jean-Marie